Mampsoukrenai or Mapsoukrenai was a settlement and station (mutatio) of ancient Cilicia, on the road between Tyana and Tarsus, inhabited during Roman Byzantine times. 

Its site is tentatively located near Kırıtlar in Asiatic Turkey.

References

Populated places in ancient Cilicia
Former populated places in Turkey
Populated places of the Byzantine Empire
History of Mersin Province